Edmund Archer may refer to:
 Edmund Archer (priest) (1673–1739), English Anglican Archdeadon
 Edmund Archer (artist) (1904–1986), American artist